Bomarsheh (also Romanized as Bomārsheh) is a village in Yusefvand Rural District, in the Central District of Selseleh County, Lorestan Province, Iran. At the 2006 census, its population was 242, in 46 families.

References 

Towns and villages in Selseleh County